Abdul Malik Faisal (born 3 April 1967) is an Indonesian windsurfer. He competed in the men's Division II event at the 1988 Summer Olympics.

References

External links
 
 

1967 births
Living people
Indonesian windsurfers
Indonesian male sailors (sport)
Olympic sailors of Indonesia
Sailors at the 1988 Summer Olympics – Division II
Asian Games bronze medalists for Indonesia
Asian Games medalists in sailing
Sailors at the 1986 Asian Games
Sailors at the 1998 Asian Games
Medalists at the 1986 Asian Games
Place of birth missing (living people)
21st-century Indonesian people
20th-century Indonesian people